Tobias Müller may refer to:

 Tobias Müller (footballer, born 1989), Swiss footballer
 Tobias Müller (footballer, born 1993), German footballer
 Tobias Müller (footballer, born 1994), German footballer
 Tobias Müller (darts player) (born 1989), German darts player